Heinz Klingenberg may refer to:

 Heinz Klingenberg (actor) (1905–1959), German actor
 Heinz Klingenberg (philologist) (born 1934), German philologist